United Nations Security Council resolution 1257, adopted unanimously on 3 August 1999, after recalling previous resolutions on East Timor (Timor Leste), particularly Resolution 1246 (1999), the Council extended the mandate of the United Nations Mission in East Timor (UNAMET) until 30 September 1999.

The Security Council noted that the Secretary-General Kofi Annan had decided to postpone the East Timor Special Autonomy Referendum until 30 August 1999 for technical reasons, and extended UNAMET's mandate accordingly. He stated that "as well as a delay in the start of voter registration, UNAMET needed more time to collate the list of voters, publicise it and allow for an appeals procedure".

See also 
 1999 East Timorese crisis
 International Force for East Timor
 Indonesian occupation of East Timor
 United Nations Transitional Administration in East Timor
 List of United Nations Security Council Resolutions 1201 to 1300 (1998–2000)

References

External links
 
Text of the Resolution at undocs.org

 1257
1999 in East Timor
1999 in Indonesia
 1257
 1257
August 1999 events